Bharatiya Janata Party, Andhra Pradesh (or BJP Andhra Pradesh) (BJP;), 
is the state unit of the Bharatiya Janata Party in Andhra Pradesh. Its head office is situated in Guntur, Andhra Pradesh. The current President of BJP Andhra Pradesh is Somu Veerraju.

Presidents

National Presidents from united Andhra Pradesh

United Andhra Pradesh Party President

Andhra Pradesh Party President

BJP Central Ministers from Andhra Pradesh

BJP Assembly Floor Leaders

BJP Legislative Council Floor Leaders

LokSabha elections performance

Legislative electoral performance

See also
 Bharatiya Janata Party
 National Democratic Alliance
 Jana Sena Party
 Andhra Pradesh Legislative Assembly
 Telangana Legislative Assembly

References

Andhra Pradesh
Political parties in Andhra Pradesh